Events from the year 1731 in Ireland.

Incumbent
Monarch: George II

Events
 June 25 – the Royal Dublin Society is founded by members of the Dublin Philosophical Society, chiefly Thomas Prior and Samuel Madden, as the "Dublin Society for Improving Husbandry, Manufactures and other Useful Arts and Sciences".
 The Parliament of Ireland first meets in the new Irish Houses of Parliament on College Green in Dublin designed by Edward Lovett Pearce.

Births
January 25 – Robert Harpur, educator and politician in New York (d. 1825)
May 28 – James Stopford, 2nd Earl of Courtown, politician (d. 1810)
Robert Barry, lawyer and politician (d. 1793)
George Bryan, businessman, statesman and politician in Pennsylvania (d. 1791)
John Butler, 12th Baron Dunboyne, apostate Roman Catholic Bishop of Cork (d. 1800)
Approximate date – Richard Townsend, politician (d. 1783)

Deaths
April 15 – Oliver St George, politician (b. 1661)
June 30 – Francis Bernard, lawyer and politician (b. 1663)
August 4 – Gabriel O'Kelly, Roman Catholic Bishop of Elphin.

References 

 
Years of the 18th century in Ireland
Ireland
1730s in Ireland